The 2020 American Athletic Conference women's soccer tournament was the postseason women's soccer tournament for the American Athletic Conference, which was held on April 15  and April 17, 2021. Because of the COVID-19 pandemic, the tournament was played by only four teams instead of the usual six. All games were hosted at Corbett Stadium by regular season champion South Florida, who was also the defending tournament champion. The single-elimination tournament consisted of two rounds based on seeding from regular season conference play. The South Florida Bulls won the title by defeating third seeded Cincinnati 4–0 in the championship game, for their second tournament title in a row and third overall.

Bracket 

Source:

Schedule

Semifinals

Final

Statistics

Goalscorers

All-Tournament team 
Source:

* Offensive MVP

^ Defensive MVP

See also 

 2020 American Athletic Conference Men's Soccer Tournament

References 

American Athletic Conference Women's Soccer Tournament
2020 American Athletic Conference women's soccer season